"Dreamlover" is a song recorded by American singer-songwriter and record producer Mariah Carey, released on July 27, 1993, as the lead single from her third studio album, Music Box (1993). Its lyrics were written by Carey, with music composed by Carey and Dave Hall, and was produced by Carey, Walter Afanasieff and Hall. The song incorporates a sample of the hook from "Blind Alley" by the Emotions—previously used in "Ain't No Half-Steppin'" (1988) by Big Daddy Kane—into its melody and instrumentation. "Dreamlover" marked a more pronounced attempt on Carey's part to incorporate hip hop into her music, as was seen in her decision to work with Hall, who had previously produced What's the 411? (1992) by Mary J Blige. This was partly in light of the mixed reception to her previous studio effort Emotions (1991), which featured gospel and 1960s soul influences. Lyrically, the song pictures a protagonist calling for a perfect lover, her "dreamlover," to whisk her away into the night and not "disillusion" her like others in the past.

"Dreamlover" received positive reviews from contemporary music critics, many of whom praised the song's incorporated sample, as well as Carey's carefree vocal style. The song was the first of several of her lead singles that sampled older tunes as a musical bed, as seen in "Fantasy" (1995), "Honey" (1997), "Heartbreaker" (1999), and "Loverboy" (2001). It was a global success, becoming Carey's seventh chart topper on the US Billboard Hot 100, remaining there for eight weeks. It peaked at number one in Canada and Panama, and became a top-ten hit in Australia, the Netherlands, New Zealand, Portugal and the United Kingdom.

Carey performed "Dreamlover" live on several televised talk shows around the world, including The Arsenio Hall Show in September 1993, the British music chart program Top of the Pops, and the 1993 Music Fair in Japan. In 1999, following the release of Carey's Rainbow, the song was included in the Mariah Carey Homecoming Special, and her appearance on The Today Show. Additionally, "Dreamlover" was featured in the set-lists of most of her succeeding tours, making its debut on the Music Box Tour (1993). The song was included on Carey's compilation albums, #1's (1998), Greatest Hits (2001), and #1 to Infinity (2015). The European B-side "Do You Think Of Me" is included in the compilation album The Rarities (2020).

The song's music video was filmed by Diane Martel in Copake, New York, in June 1993. It includes an appearance by Carey's dog Jack, and shows Carey dancing in a flowerbed and field, swimming in a large pond, boarding a hot air balloon, and dancing alongside several shirtless male dancers. According to author Chris Nickson, the video's carefree setting harmonized well with the song's soft instrumentation. Due to the song's strong radio airplay and extended charting, the video received frequent play on several music video channels throughout the summer of 1993.

Background 
Carey's debut studio album made a strong impact on pop music, but the singer became interested in altering her sound and branching out into other genres for her second studio effort, Emotions (1991). Columbia allowed her to take more control over her musical direction, enabling her to change the musical genre, melodies, and production style. Carey worked with many new musicians and producers on the album; Walter Afanasieff was the only holdover from her debut. Emotions contained influences from gospel, R&B and soul music as well as from 1950s, 60s, and 70s balladry. While the album was praised by some as being more mature and raw, it failed to reach the critical or commercial heights of her debut effort, selling fewer units and failing to introduce Carey into new markets. Columbia decided to return Carey to the same genre as her debut album and have her produce a more commercial and radio-friendly record. Their plans were to tone down Carey's vocals and soften the album's production to create a contemporary pop record. Carey and Afanasieff agreed to the change and began writing and recording material for her third studio effort, Music Box (1993).

Recording 
While recording Music Box, Carey began to alter her songwriting style and genre choices, most notably in "Dreamlover". The song is different from anything she had recorded on her previous album, as it leans on R&B and light hip-hop influences. While searching for new record producers for the album, Carey came across Dave Hall, a New York native who was known from his work on Mary J. Blige's debut album, What's the 411? (1992). Carey wanted to incorporate a sampled loop from an older song into "Dreamlover", her second song to do so. The pair reviewed several older tunes and melodies, and chose "Blind Alley", performed by The Emotions in 1972. This song had previously been sampled in Big Daddy Kane's "Ain't No Half-Steppin'", which led Mariah to use the sample for Dreamlover.
 In an interview with Fred Bronson, Carey described working with Hall:
"I wanted to do something that had a happy feeling, something that was more open and released, and that's really not Dave. It's very anti what he's about. So he said, 'Oh, you want to do that happy stuff? All right, all right.' He was not into doing it. Then we started listening to a lot of different and old loops and we used the 'Blind Alley' loop and I started singing the melody over it."
Although Carey had heard the hook used in several other songs over the years, she felt her use of the sample was done in a more innovative way. "We built the song from there and I wrote the lyrics and the melody and Dave ended up liking it," she continued. After having completed the song, Hall complimented Carey's work ethic and form of writing, calling her a "perfectionist" and "very professional." He explained that they incorporated the hook, a melody, and the sample into the song over the course of one night. The song's title was not added until the end of production. Hall said Carey works in a unique fashion, usually developing the song's instrumentals and hook prior to the lyrics and title. Carey describes the songwriting process:
"The way I usually work is I do an untitled song. We'll grab the hook, whether sampled or created, and use it as the working title. I wrote the verses first, as well as the melody and the inclusion of several instrumentals. Sometimes I'll have an idea for a lyrics. If I'm collaborating with someone, I'll direct them in the direction that I'm going chord wise, because I get all these melody ideas and then I lose them if I don't have someone really good with the keyboard with me. That's why I tend to collaborate because I lose the ideas by the time I figure out the chord. All these melody ideas just go."
When Carey's fiancé at the time, Tommy Mottola, came to hear the song in the studio, he had mixed feelings. He approached Walter Afanasieff and asked him to add some additional instrumentation and flavor. Afanasieff changed the song at the production level, altering the way in which the hook sample was incorporated into the song, as well as adding several new instruments. He described the changes to Bronson in an interview:
"Mariah and Dave did this loop thing which was new to us pop producers at the time. Their version of 'Dreamlover' was missing a lot of stuff. The spirit of the song was up but it wasn't hitting hard enough. I re-worked the drums, organ and keyboard. The organ and hi-hat part I changed made it a bit more swinging and a little bit more driving. I put a whole new shade of colors to it."

Composition and lyrics 

"Dreamlover" is a mid-tempo pop and R&B track with hip hop influences. The song begins at a moderate pace of 100 beats per minute before moving to a "pop-rock groove" of the same tempo after the introduction. It has the sequence of Fmaj7–Gm7–Fmaj7–Gm7 as its chord progression. Carey's vocal range spans three octaves and seven semitones from the low note of F3 to the high note of C7.

The song was written and produced by Carey and Hall, with additional work done by Afanasieff, who added a slightly altered instrumentation. "Dreamlover" samples the hook and a musical loop from "Blind Alley" by R&B group The Emotions. The sampling provides a "backbone" for the instrumentation and production, as well as being inter-looped in the bridge. Carey uses a whistle register to introduce the first verse.

In his review, Jozen Cummings from PopMatters described the song as "pure, frothy pop." Cummings felt Afanasieff's usage of the Hammond B3 organ added "an old school vibe" to "Dreamlover", as it harmonizes with the "extremely catchy musical hook." Cummings describes the theme of the lyrics:
"... the lyric is a description of, and a call for, the mythic Dreamlover; someone to take her away, to 'rescue' her. Fluffy-seeming stuff, to be sure (and possibly cringe-inducing for some folk), but very possibly also an expression of the simplest of romantic dreams: to find the 'right' person; someone who makes you feel taken care of, loved, safe."

Cummings called the second verse's first lines "Don't want another pretender / To disillusion me one more time / Whispering words of forever / Playing with my mind" an "interesting mix of innocence and very grown-up cynicism and world-weariness." Wayne Robins from Newsday compared the vocals to "Motown and Philly soul singing," while praising Afansieff's inclusion of the Hammond B-3 for the way the "riffs provide a nice organic contrast to the synthesizers that dominate the record."

Critical reception 

"Dreamlover" earned widely positive reviews from music critics, many of whom praised its production, the sampling of the hook, and the vocals. In reference to the common criticism that Carey over-sings and over-uses her upper registers, Cummings wrote "truth is, she is never crass in the use of her amazing instrument. On 'Dreamlover', especially, she keeps a close, tasteful rein on the acrobatics." Ron Wynn from Allmusic called it personal and intense. He enjoyed Carey's more mature vocal style on the album, as well as the usage of the hook and the instrumentation. J. D. Considine from The Baltimore Sun called its melody "breezy", while The Buffalo Newss reviewer described it as "a sassy, pop rocker with a dance beat". Larry Flick from Billboard said it is "direct, unfussy, and profoundly pretty". He added, "The production is elegant but appealingly simplistic. Mariah's openhearted singing is up front, where it belongs, with a funky snare and kick-drum just a subtle half-step behind. The gliding, devotional pledge culminates in a lovely vocals-only tagline." Troy J. Augusto from Cashbox named it Pick of the Week, stating that Carey "tones down the vocal  here, her seductive, captivating voice flowing smoothly and beautifully on this sprite, sparsely produced love song". David Browne from Entertainment Weekly felt the singer's soft singing and lack of volume was hurtful to the song, saying she "lost herself." He thought the hook was catchy, but overly familiar. In 2018, the magazine noted the track's "glorious, frolicking-in-cutoffs groove." Blogger Roger Friedman from Fox News named "Dreamlover" and "Vision of Love" Carey's best, calling them "the original hits."

Dave Sholin from the Gavin Report said that the song is "a pop delight." In his weekly UK chart commentary, James Masterton noted, "This new track debuts strongly then, and being far more catchy and original than most Mariah Carey material may well breach the Top 10 at least." Alan Jones from Music Week gave it four out of five and named it Pick of the Week, deeming it as "an ultra-commercial, hook-laden and impeccably sung confection" that "starts with a supersonic screech and ends with an a capella tag." He added further, "In between, Carey exercises more restraint than usual in the vocal gymnastics department to great effect, proving that sometimes less is more." Jeff Silberman from The Network Forty described it as "a delicious midtempo pop gem, bolstered by in-the-pocket instrumentation, Carey's pristine vocals and a velvet production sound". A reviewer from People Magazine felt that "with its appealing girlish playfulness, it’s the kind of breezy pop she excels at." Tom Moon from The Philadelphia Inquirer called the song "irresistibly bubbly". The Plain Dealer noted that it "starts out with one of those upper-register vocal runs that can make dogs howl and shatter glassware in neighboring states." In an retrospective review, Pop Rescue stated that Carey's vocals "are confident, strong, and also perfectly partnered to this chilled out track", adding it as "wonderful" song. While reviewing Butterfly (1997), Rich Juzwiak of Slant Magazine praised the song's incorporation of the "Blind Alley" hook, saying it was done "as sweetly as possible."

Entertainment Weekly listed the song as one of "The 100 Greatest Moments in Rock Music: The 90s"; it was their top pick for 1993. "Dreamlover" received a Grammy Award nomination for Best Female Pop Vocal Performance.

 Chart performance 
"Dreamlover" was Carey's seventh number one single on the Billboard Hot 100, topping the chart in its sixth week and stayed there for eight consecutive weeks (September 5 to October 30, 1993)—her longest stay at the time. It replaced "Can't Help Falling in Love" by UB40, and was later replaced by Meat Loaf's "I'd Do Anything for Love (But I Won't Do That)." It spent 26 weeks in the top 40 and was ranked number eight on the Hot 100 1993 Year-End Charts and 20 on the Decade-End Charts. The song was certified platinum by the Recording Industry Association of America (RIAA) on September 22, 1993, denoting shipments of over one million units throughout the United States. It sold 935,000 units domestically. "Dreamlover" holds the joint title of the highest debuting song on the Billboard Pop Songs chart, entering the chart at number 12 on the week dated August 14, 1993, being tied by Taylor Swift's "Shake It Off" in 2014. In Canada, "Dreamlover" became Carey's fifth number one single on the Canadian RPM Singles Chart, debuting at number 60 on the chart during the week of August 14, 1993. Three weeks later, the song reached the chart's number one position; it spent six consecutive weeks at the top and a total of 21 weeks on the singles chart. On the RPM Year-End Charts, "Dreamlover" finished at number two.

"Dreamlover" entered the Australian Singles Chart at number 41 during the week of August 23, 1993, eventually reaching a peak of number seven and spending a total of 21 consecutive weeks on the chart. The song was certified gold by the Australian Recording Industry Association (ARIA), denoting shipments of over 35,000 units throughout the country. In New Zealand, "Dreamlover" reached a peak position of number two on the New Zealand Singles Chart and spent sixteen weeks fluctuating on the chart. The Recording Industry Association of New Zealand (RIANZ) certified the song gold for shipments of 7,500 units in the country. On the Dutch Top 40, "Dreamlover" debuted at number 36 during the week of August 28, 1993. After attaining a peak of number nine, the song dropped off the top 40 after a chart run of 13 weeks. On the yearly charts, the song finished at number 69. In Switzerland the song peaked at number thirteen and spent sixteen weeks on the singles chart. On the UK Singles Chart, "Dreamlover" reached its peak position of number nine during the week of September 4, 1993. It spent a total of ten weeks on the chart, exiting on October 23, 1993. Sales in the United Kingdom are estimated at 150,000 units.

 Music video and remixes 
The accompanying music video for "Dreamlover" was directed by Diane Martel and filmed in Copake, New York in June 1993. It was published on Mariah Carey's official YouTube channel in November 2009. The video has amassed more than 35 million views as of September 2021. It features scenes of Carey swimming in a small pond by a waterfall, boarding a colorful hot air balloon, and dancing alongside several shirtless male dancers. As the video begins, Carey is swimming underwater while wearing clothing. She is soon gasping for air and climbing into a flower bed above. As she frolics and rolls in a field, scenes of Carey boarding a hot air balloon are intercut. Her dog Jack makes an appearance, as he follows her through the field and pond. After a short interval of dancing alongside several male dancers, Carey leaves with her dog as the video concludes. After filming the video, Carey revealed that the water was so cold that she refused to swim until the director, Martel, dived in first. Author Chris Nickson felt the video captured the song's soft and relaxed nature: "The casual feel, almost like clips from home movies edited together, captured the song's off-the-shoulder airiness." The video received heavy rotation on several music video channels, which added to the song's chart performance. On August 7, 2020, the music video was re-released in a remastered form, in HD quality.

"Dreamlover" marked the first time Carey was given creative control over remixing her songs. She enlisted David Morales to create the Def Club Mix; it was the first of Carey's remixes to use re-recorded vocals. An officially-released live version of "Dreamlover", derived from the television special Here Is Mariah Carey (1993), is available. "Dreamlover" B-side track ("Do You Think of Me") was written and produced by Carey, Afanasieff, Cory Rooney, and Mark Morales. Kelefa Sanneh from The New York Times complimented the remix, writing "[It] is a revelation: after a long percussion break, he isolates a few of Ms. Carey's ad-libs; her ultrafalsetto vocals sound spookier than all of Basement Jaxx's sound effects combined."

On August 7, 2020, along with the celebration of the 30th-anniversary of her debut studio album Mariah Carey (1990), as well as Carey celebrating 30 years in the music industry, the song was released as an eleven-track extended play, titled Dreamlover EP, which contains the remixes from the US CD maxi-single, as well as previously unreleased remixes, including 'Def Club Mix Edit', 'Def Club Mix Edit 2005', 'Theo's Club Joint' and 'Bam Jam Soul'. Her live performances at Madison Square Garden for the TV special Fantasy: Mariah Carey at Madison Square Garden (1995), and at Proctor's Theatre for the TV special Here Is Mariah Carey (1993), were also included on the EP.

 Live performances 

Carey performed "Dreamlover" on several telecasts in the United States and throughout Europe. She performed the song live on The Arsenio Hall Show with "Hero" as a two-piece set-list. Carey performed "Dreamlover" at British music program Top of the Pops, the Dutch program Platendaagse, and the Japanese program Music Fair. In a promotional effort for her seventh studio album Rainbow, Carey filmed a FOX special titled The Mariah Carey Homecoming Special, a mini-concert filmed at her old high school in Huntington, New York. It was aired on December 21, 1999. "Dreamlover" served as one of the opening numbers. The song was performed on June 1, 2003, at The Today Show as part of a three-song set alongside "Yours" and "Bringin' On the Heartbreak" as a promotion for Carey's 2002 album, Charmbracelet.

Following the televised appearances, Carey performed the song live on several of her tours. In the Daydream World Tour she performed it in front of a backdrop showing footage from the song's video. On her Music Box Tour and Butterfly World Tour, the song served as the fifth song of the set-list. Carey performed alongside several female back-up dancers who mimicked her light dance routines. Carey used a similar presentation on the Rainbow World Tour. On Carey's Charmbracelet and The Adventures of Mimi tours, three male backup dancers were featured on stage, with the three female background vocalists behind them. On the latter tour, Carey's wore a black bikini, with a matching cape and Christian Louboutin pumps. She mixed the song with an instrumental remix of Mtume's song "Juicy Fruit." Following the release of her twelfth studio album, Memoirs of an Imperfect Angel (2009), Carey embarked on the Angels Advocate Tour. It was her first tour that did not regularly feature the song, as it was only performed on a few select dates. In addition, Carey sang the song as a part of her Las Vegas residency, #1 to Infinity, which chronicles the singer's 18 US Hot 100 number-one hits. For the performance, she donned a sequined white dress, and entered the stage in a pink convertible car. At the end of the performance, she stands atop a stage fan, while her skirt blows in the wind, as an homage to Marilyn Monroe. On Carey's Caution World Tour, "Dreamlover" served as the second song of the set-list.

 Track listing and formats 

 Austrian CD maxi-single "Dreamlover" – 3:53
 "Dreamlover" (Def Club Mix) – 10:43
 "Dreamlover" (Eclipse Dub) – 4:52
 European 7" vinyl "Dreamlover" – 3:53
 "Do You Think of Me" – 4:46
 European/UK CD maxi-single "Dreamlover" – 3:53
 "Do You Think of Me" – 4:46
 "Someday" – 3:57
 US CD maxi-single "Dreamlover" (Album Version) – 3:53
 "Dreamlover" (Def Club Mix) – 10:43
 "Dreamlover" (Def Instrumental) – 6:20
 "Dreamlover" (USA Love Dub) – 7:10
 "Dreamlover" (Eclipse Dub) – 4:52
 "Dreamlover" (Def Tribal Mix) – 6:41

 Dreamlover EP "Dreamlover" (Def Club Mix Edit) – 4:04
 "Dreamlover" (Def Club Mix) – 10:46
 "Dreamlover" (Def Club Mix Edit 2005) – 4:23
 "Dreamlover" (Def Tribal Mix) – 6:42
 "Dreamlover" (Eclipse Dub) – 4:53
 "Dreamlover" (USA Love Dub) – 7:11
 "Dreamlover" (Theo's Joint Club) – 4:35
 "Dreamlover" (Bam Jam Soul) – 4:27
 "Dreamlover" (Def Instrumental) – 6:22
 "Dreamlover" (Live at Madison Square Garden – October 1995) – 3:54
 "Dreamlover" (Live at Proctor's Theater, NY – 1993) – 3:57

 Credits and personnel 
These credits were adapted from the Music Box liner notes.

"Dreamlover" was recorded at Right Track Studios, New York, and mixed at Sony Music Studios, New York.
 Mariah Carey – co-producing, songwriting, vocals
 Dave Hall – co-producing, songwriting, synthesizer
 Walter Afanasieff – co-producing, songwriting, organ
 Bob Ross – engineering
 Ren Klyce – programming
 Mick Guzauski – mixing
 Bob Ludwig – mastering

 Charts 

 Weekly charts 

 Year-end charts 

 Decade-end charts 

 All-time charts 

 Certifications and sales 

 See also 
 List of Billboard Hot 100 number-one singles of 1993
 List of number-one dance singles of 1993 (U.S.)

 References Works cited'

 
 
 

1990s ballads
1993 singles
1993 songs
Billboard Hot 100 number-one singles
Columbia Records singles
Mariah Carey songs
Music videos directed by Diane Martel
Pop ballads
RPM Top Singles number-one singles
Contemporary R&B ballads
Song recordings produced by Walter Afanasieff
Songs written by Dave Hall (record producer)
Songs written by Mariah Carey
Songs written by Walter Afanasieff
Sony Music singles